The Tribe is a 1998 television film drama written and directed by Stephen Poliakoff and starring Joely Richardson, Jeremy Northam, Trevor Eve, Jonathan Rhys-Meyers and Anna Friel.

Property developer Northam is tasked with evicting a post-modern hippie proto-cult led by Richardson from a building. But they slowly win him over to their dark lifestyle, bizarre rituals, eating habits and dangerous liaisons.

The film was made in 1996, but not transmitted until 1998. Music is by Poliakoff regular Adrian Johnston and it carries some of the Polikov trademarks such as photograph studies.

Controversial for its nudity and a much discussed ménage à trois sex scene between characters played by Anna Friel (her first work after leaving Brookside), Jonathan Rhys Meyers and Jeremy Northam.

References

External links
 
 Screen online article

1998 films
1998 drama films
Films directed by Stephen Poliakoff
British drama films
1990s English-language films
1990s British films